Champlain was a federal electoral district in Quebec, Canada, that was represented in the House of Commons of Canada from 1867 to 2004.

It was created in 1867 as part of the British North America Act, 1867. It was abolished in 2003 when it was redistributed into the districts of Saint-Maurice—Champlain and Trois-Rivières.

Members of Parliament 
This riding elected the following Members of Parliament:

Election results

List of MPs for districts that included Champlain (since 1867) 
The following list contains members of districts that have included Champlain, since 1867:

See also 
 List of Canadian federal electoral districts
 Mauricie
 Past Canadian electoral districts

References

External links 
 Riding history from the Library of Parliament

Former federal electoral districts of Quebec